Jandamarra's War is a 2011 Australian drama style documentary that tells the story of Jandamarra, a famous Aboriginal Australian warrior of the Bunuba people from Western Australia.

Synopsis
Jandamarra's War begins by detailing Jandamarra's early years, starting with his birth in 1873 and he and his mother Jinny's relocation when he was around the age of seven where he looked after cattle at the station at Lennard River Flats, for safety at a time when European colonists were frequently killing Aboriginal Australians. As a teenager, he left the cattle station with his Uncle Ellemarra to be initiated in Bunuba Law, but when they are caught spearing sheep both are sent to prison. After he left prison, he was expelled from Bunuba society for sleeping with other men's women and soon after he became friends with a policeman named Richardson. Later he killed Richardson, marking the beginning of his three-year war against the Europeans.

In 1894, Jandamarra led a rebellion against invading European pastoralists in order to defend Bunuba land and culture.

Jandamarra spent the last few years of his life hiding in his spirit country, Djumbud. His incredible ability to outwit police officers lead many to believe he had magical powers and many pastoralists left the Kimberley area for fear of him. His life ended when he was shot dead by Mungo Micki, an Aboriginal tracker.

Cast
Darcy Anderson as Fred Edgar
David Beurteaux as Lukin
Emmanuel J. Brown as Lilimarra
Gabriel Brown as Baby Jandamarra
Tamara Cherel as Mayannie
Grant Currie as Drewry
Ernie Dingo as Narrator (voice)
Peter Docker as Richardson
Bevan Green as Young Jandamarra
Andy Hallen as Forester
Keithan Holloway as Jandamarra
Stanley Jangary Snr. as Ellemarra
Kaylene Marr as Jinny
Jack Mccale as Micki
Blythe McGuckin as Blythe
Craig Snell as Gibbs
Kurt Wheatley as Constable Pilmer
Brendon Williams as Captain
Bruce Williams as Jim Crowe
Matt Wood as Nicholson

Production

Script
Director and scriptwriter Mitch Torres wanted the film to portray the story of Jandamarra as accurately as possible, noting that:

Filming
Principal filming took place over ten days in June 2010 and most of the film's scenes were shot on Bunuba land in locations close to where the historical events being reenacted actually occurred.

Reviews
Jim Schembri wrote in The Age that "historical documentaries are at their best when they illuminate a little known narrative rather than merely recite a famous one. Hopefully, it will only be a matter of time before some wily filmmakers seize on the potential to develop Jandamarra's story into a full-blown feature film".

Awards

See also
Jandamarra

References

External links

2011 television films
2011 films
2011 documentary films
Australian documentary films
Films set in Western Australia
Documentary films about Aboriginal Australians
Films set in the Outback
2010s English-language films